The Head of the Family may refer to:

 The Head of the Family (1922 film), a 1922 British silent comedy film directed by Manning Haynes
 Head of the Family (1933 film), a 1933 British drama film directed by John Daumery
 The Head of the Family (1967 film), a 1967 Italian comedy film directed by Nanni Loy
 Head of the Family, a 1996 b movie black comedy
 Head of the Family (TV pilot)

See also
 The Commission (mafia), the heads of the 5 Families
 Heads of former ruling families
 Family (disambiguation)
 Head (disambiguation)